Javier Puertas Cabezudo is a Spanish lightweight rower. He won a gold medal at the 1979 World Rowing Championships in Bled with the lightweight men's eight.

References

Year of birth missing (living people)
Spanish male rowers
World Rowing Championships medalists for Spain
Living people
20th-century Spanish people